Marty Turner (born 7 May 1981), is a New Zealand former professional rugby league footballer who played in the 2000s. He played for the Melbourne Storm from 2002 to 2003 and Oldham RLFC (Heritage No. 1159) in England.

Making his first grade rugby league debut during the 2002 NRL season for Melbourne, he replaced Matt Orford for two games early in the season. On 9 April 2002, Turner and teammate Michael Russo were involved in a motor vehicle accident, that resulted in Turner being rushed to intensive care, spending days in hospital with a ruptured spleen, fractured ribs, severe concussion and bruising.

References

External links
 http://www.rugbyleagueproject.org/players/Marty_Turner/summary.html
 https://orl-heritagetrust.org.uk/player/marty-turner/

1981 births
Living people
Melbourne Storm players
New Zealand rugby league players
Oldham R.L.F.C. players
Redcliffe Dolphins players
Rugby articles needing expert attention
Rugby league five-eighths
Rugby league players from Christchurch